Figure 8 (figure of 8 in British English) may refer to:

 8 (number), in Arabic numerals

Entertainment 
 Figure 8 (album), a 2000 album by Elliott Smith
 "Figure of Eight" (song), a 1989 song by Paul McCartney
 Figure Eight EP, a 2008 EP by This Et Al
 "Figure 8" (song), a 2012 song by Ellie Goulding from Halcyon
 "Figure Eight", an episode and song from the children's educational series Schoolhouse Rock!
 "Figure of Eight", song by Status Quo from In Search of the Fourth Chord
 "Figure 8", a song by FKA Twigs from the EP M3LL155X

Geography 
 Figure Eight Island, North Carolina, United States
 Figure Eight Lake, Alberta, Canada
 Figure-Eight Loops, feature of the Historic Columbia River Highway in Guy W. Talbot State Park

Mathematics and sciences 
 Figure-eight knot (mathematics), in knot theory
 ∞, symbol meaning infinity
 Lemniscate, various types of mathematical curve that resembles a figure 8
 Figure 8, a two-lobed Lissajous curve
 Figure 8, in topology, the rose with two petals
 Figure 8, shape described by an analemma, a curve in astronomy

Ropes 
 Figure eight bend or Flemish bend, a knot
 Figure-eight knot, typically used as a stopper knot 
 Figure-eight loop, figure of eight knot tied "on the bight"

Sport and leisure 
 Figure 8 racing, a category of auto racing related to the demolition derby
 Figure 8 roller coaster, a track design
 Figure 8, shape from which compulsory figures in ice skating are derived
 Figure 8, a riding figure used in the training of horses
 Figure-eight, type of noseband
 Figure eight turn, man overboard rescue turn in sailing
 Figure 8 (belay device), a piece of rock climbing equipment
 Figure of 8, figure in English country dance
 Figure eight (angling), a technique used by anglers to fish specifically for the muskellunge

Other uses 
 Figure 8 Puffer (Tetraodon biocellatus), breed of pufferfish
 Figure 8 or bi-directional, response pattern of some microphones
 An IEC 60320 C7 power connector
 Figure Eight Inc., a crowdsourcing company related to machine learning

See also
 8 (disambiguation)
 List of knots, the names of several of which contain "figure 8" or similar